Samvel Aslanyan (born 23 February 1986) is a Russian handball player who plays for Steaua București. He competed at the 2008 Summer Olympics in Beijing, where the Russian team placed sixth.

References

1986 births
Living people
Russian male handball players
Handball players at the 2008 Summer Olympics
Olympic handball players of Russia
Russian people of Armenian descent
Sportspeople from Voronezh
Expatriate handball players
Russian expatriate sportspeople in Romania 

Russian expatriate sportspeople in Portugal